Werner Stötzer (born Sonneberg 2 April 1931, died Altlangsow 22 July 2010) was a German Artist and Sculptor.  For the last three decades of his life he lived and worked in Altlangsow (administratively part of Seelow) in the marshy Oderbruch region of Brandenburg.

Life
After a training as a Ceramics modeller at the Vocational Arts Academy in Sonneberg, Stötzer moved on to study between 1949 and 1951 at the Grand Ducal Arts Academy in Weimar, where his teachers included Heinrich Domke, Hans van Breek and Siegfried Tschiersky.   Because of a reorganisation at the Weimar academy he then transferred to Dresden where he continued his studies at the city's Academy of Fine Arts from 1951 till 1953, taught by Eugen Hoffmann and Walter Arnold.  Between 1954 and 1958 her was a "Master Schoolman" (Meisterschüler) with Gustav Seitz at the Berlin Academy of Arts where contemporaries included Manfred Böttcher, Harald Metzkes and the painter Ernst Schroeder.   He formed lifelong friendships with the first two of these three.   On concluding of his time as a Master Schoolman he embarked on a career as a freelance artist.

In 1974 he worked with Konrad Wolf on the tragicomedy film The Naked Man on the Sports Ground ("Der nackte Mann auf dem Sportplatz"), himself taking a small cameo role as the town mayor.

Werner Stötzer also worked as a teacher. From 1975 till 1978 he was a guest lecturer at the Berlin-Weißensee High Arts Academy, and between 1987 and 1990 he held a teaching professorship at the East German Arts Academy.  From 1978 he was employed at the Berlin Arts Academy where he served as Vice-president from 1990-1993. and where he personally mentored a number of younger artists.   His own "Master Schoolmen" from this period included  Horst Engelhardt, Berndt Wilde, Joachim Böttcher (1989-1992) and Mark Lammert.
 
Werner Stötzer was first married to graphic Artist Renate Rauschenbach from 1961 to 1992. With their daughter Carla (*1961) they lived in their house in Berlin-Altglienicke from 1961 to 1978 in. After living in a succession of apartments and ateliers in Berlin and Vilmnitz (Putbus) on the Island of Rügen, he relocated to Altlangsow, some 70 km (45 miles) to the east of Berlin and (since 1945) some 20 km (12 miles) to the west of the frontier with Poland.  Here, for almost thirty years, he worked, living in a former presbytery with his second wife, the sculptress Sylvia Hagen. From this marriage their son Carl-Hagen Stötzer was born in 1978.
 "What lies within me is neither Heaven nor Hell.  It is humanity."
 „Mein Inhalt ist weder der Himmel noch die Hölle, es ist der Mensch.“
Werner Stötzer   2010

Awards and honours 
 1962 Will Lammert Prize from the (East) German Academy of Arts
 1975 Käthe Kollwitz Prize from the (East) German Academy of Arts
 1977 National Prize of East Germany
 1986 National Prize of East Germany
 1994 Ernst Rietschel Arts Prize for Sculpture
 2008 Brandenburg Arts Prize
 2009 Honorary citizenship of the Town of Seelow

Works (not a complete list) 
 1956 Sitzender Junge, Bronze
 1959/60 Fragen eines lesenden Arbeiters und Lesender Arbeiter in the courtyard of the Berlin State Library, Unter den Linden, Bronzerelief
 1963 Portrait of Gerhard Kettner, Bronze bust
 1965 Grieving women, Marble relief
 1966-1968 Bronze door for the Our Lady Monastery, Magdeburg
 1967 Babi Jar, Relief and Lithography
 1970 Draft Bronze door for the St Thomas's Church in Erfurt
 1972 Auschwitz group, Marble
 1980 Stage sets and mask for Electra at the German Theatre, Berlin
 1981 Große Sitzende (Internationales Bildhauersymposion Formen für Europa – Formen aus Stein in Syke)
 1982–84 Saale and Werra, Sculpture Park, Magdeburg
 1985-86 Marble Relief wall Alte Welt for the Marx-Engels-Forum in Berlin-Mitte
 1986–87 Mother and child
 1988 Gypsey woman from Marzahn
 1995 Torso (für Eberhard Roters)
 1996 Fliehende (Flying)
 1996 Undine
 2002 Liegende (reclining)
2010 Torso, leicht gedreht (Torso, turned slightly)

Exhibitions (not a complete list) 
 1960 Berlin, Staatliche Museen zu Berlin, National Gallery (Berlin)
 1963 Magdeburg, Kulturhistorisches Museum (zusammen mit Gerhard Kettner)
 1964 Altenburg, Greifswald, Stralsund, Erfurt
 1965 Wien, Galerie "ZB" (zusammen mit Gerhard Kettner)
 1970 Potsdam
 1972 Leipzig, Dresden
 1979 Rostock, Galerie am Boulevard
 1982 Ravensburg
 1986 Bremen, Gerhard-Marcks-Haus
 1995 Zürich, World Trade Center
 1996 Lago Maggiore, Via Gambarone
 1998 Frankfurt am Main, Galerie Schwind
 1999 Duisburg, Wilhelm Lehmbruck Museum
 2000 Düsseldorf, Galerie Beethovenstraße
 2001 Berlin, Galerie Leo Coppi
 2002 Berlin, galerie+edition refugium
 2003 Frankfurt am Main, Galerie Schwind
 2004 Bremen, „Sich dem Stein stellen“, Gerhard-Marcks-Haus
 2005 Dresden, Galerie Beyer
 2005 Leipzig, Galerie Schwind
 2006 Berlin, Academy of Arts (Berlin), „Märkische Steine“
 2006 Dresden, Leonhardi-Museum, „Wegzeichen“
 2006 Berlin, Galerie LEO.COPPI
 2009 Frankfurt am Main, Galerie Schwind
 2013 Hamburg, Open-Air-Schau Figur als Widerstand am Jungfernstieg (zusammen mit Alfred Hrdlicka and Bernd Stöcker)

References

German sculptors
German male sculptors
German draughtsmen
German printmakers
Recipients of the National Prize of East Germany
Academic staff of the Weißensee Academy of Art Berlin
East German culture
1931 births
2010 deaths
East German artists